The Gregory Bluffs are high granite bluffs that form the east side of Nielsen Fjord on the north coast of Victoria Land, Antarctica. These geographical features were so named by the Australian National Antarctic Research Expeditions (ANARE) for C. Gregory, a former geologist with the ANARE (Thala Dan) cruise. On February 12, 1962, pilot John Stanwix, accompanied with Gregory and their party leader Phillip Law, landed a helicopter at the foot of these bluffs to examine them. These bluffs lies situated on the Pennell Coast, a portion of Antarctica lying between Cape Williams and Cape Adare.

References

Cliffs of Victoria Land
Pennell Coast